Roberto Torres Morales (born 7 March 1989) is a Spanish professional footballer who plays as a midfielder for Persian Gulf Pro League club Foolad.

He spent the better part of his career with Osasuna, appearing in eight La Liga seasons with the club and also winning the 2018–19 Segunda División.

Club career

Osasuna
Born in Pamplona, Navarre, Torres began his career with hometown club CA Osasuna. He spent five full seasons with the B side in the Segunda División B, scoring a career-best 16 goals in 35 games in 2011–12 while being deployed mainly as an attacking midfielder.

Torres made his first-team and La Liga debut on 11 December 2011, coming off the bench for Lolo for the last 20 minutes of a 1–1 away draw against Málaga CF. On 9 August of the following year, he was definitely promoted to the main squad.

Despite appearing sparingly during 2012–13, Torres was handed his first start on 1 June 2013, and netted his team's first in a 4–2 loss at Real Madrid. In the following campaign he featured more regularly and scored five times, but suffered relegation.

On 22 July 2015, Torres signed a new three-year deal with the Rojillos until 2018. He scored a team-best 12 goals during the 2018–19 season for the Segunda División champions and, consequently, agreed to an extension until 2021 with his buyout clause being set at €10 million.

Torres put an end to his 17-year spell at the El Sadar Stadium in December 2022, having made 353 official appearances.

Foolad
Torres moved abroad for the first time in January 2023, with the 33-year-old signing for Foolad F.C. in the Persian Gulf Pro League.

Career statistics

Club

Honours
Osasuna
Segunda División: 2018–19

References

External links
Osasuna official profile 

1989 births
Living people
Spanish footballers
Footballers from Pamplona
Association football midfielders
La Liga players
Segunda División players
Segunda División B players
CA Osasuna B players
CA Osasuna players
Persian Gulf Pro League players
Foolad FC players
Basque Country international footballers
Spanish expatriate footballers
Expatriate footballers in Iran
Spanish expatriate sportspeople in Iran